The Portuguese Winter Sports Federation (FDI-Portugal) is the governing body of ice hockey, cross-country skiing, curling, alpine skiing, figure skating, speed skating, and snowboarding in Portugal.

National teams
Men's national team

Ice hockey statistics
 116 players total
 48 male players
 50 junior players
 18 female players
 7 referees
 1 indoor rink
 Not ranked in the world ranking

Other sports
The federation also supports the competitive skiing and snowboarding in Portugal.

References

External links
Official website 

1999 establishments in Portugal
Portugal
Portugal
Winter Sports
Sports organizations established in 1999
National governing bodies for ice skating